Jamie Stewart (born 22 August 1970) is an Australian cricketer. He played 20 first-class and 38 List A matches for New South Wales and Western Australia between 1992/93 and 2000/01.

References

External links
 

1970 births
Living people
Australian cricketers
New South Wales cricketers
Western Australia cricketers
Cricketers from Fremantle